Sinja is a rural municipality located in Jumla District of Karnali Province of Nepal.

The rural municipality is divided into total 6 wards.

Sinja rural municipality came into existence on 10 March 2017, when Government of Nepal restricted all old administrative structure and announced 744 local level units (although the number increased to 753 later) as per the new constitution of Nepal 2015.

Dhapa, Sanigaun and Narakot Village development committees were Incorporated to form the new Sinja rural municipality. The headquarters of the municipality is situated at Narakot.

References

External links
 http://www.sinjamun.gov.np/
 http://citypopulation.info/php/nepal-mun-admin.php?adm2id=6306

Populated places in Jumla District
Rural municipalities in Karnali Province
Rural municipalities of Nepal established in 2017